Acraea kraka, the kraka glassy acraea, is a butterfly in the family Nymphalidae. It is found in Ghana, Nigeria, Cameroon, Equatorial Guinea, the Democratic Republic of the Congo and Uganda.

Description

A. kraka Auriv. (53 b). Forewing to vein 2 and hindwing to the discal dots whitish yellow (male) or brown-yellow (female) (not black-grey as in the figure), otherwise hyaline; forewing usually with a black dot in the cell and with discal dots in 1 b and 2; hindwing in addition to the basal and discal dots usually with submarginal dots in 1 c and 2; marginal band diaphanous, 9 to 11 mm. in breadth. Cameroons, Fernando Po and Congo region in the primeval forests near Mawambi.

Subspecies
Acraea kraka kraka (eastern Nigeria, Cameroon, mainland Equatorial Guinea and Bioko)
Acraea kraka kibi Usher, 1986 (Ghana)
Acraea kraka pallida Carpenter, 1932 (western Uganda, Democratic Republic of the Congo: Uele, Ituri, Kivu)

Biology
The habitat consists of forests.

The larvae feed on Caloncoba species.

Taxonomy
See Pierre & Bernaud, 2014

References

External links

Images representing Acraea kraka at Bold

Butterflies described in 1893
kraka
Butterflies of Africa